is a 1970 Japanese film directed by Yoji Yamada.

Plot 
The Kazami family live on the island of Iōjima, Nagasaki, where Seiichi Kamazi works in a coal mine. With the coal mine closing, Seiichi decides to move to Hokkaido and become a dairy farmer. The family rides the train between the two islands (a roughly 3,000-mile journey). Along the way, they stop in Fukuyama, where Seiichi's brother Tsutomu lives, Osaka, where they attend Expo '70, and Tokyo. In Tokyo, the family's youngest daughter passes away. Genzō, Seiichi's father, reaches Hokkaido but passes away shortly after. He is buried in a Catholic ceremony. Despite Seiichi's misgivings, Tamiko (his wife) convinces him to stay and forge a new life for themselves.

Cast
 Chieko Baisho as Tamiko Kazami
 Hisashi Igawa as Seiichi Kazami
 Chishū Ryū as Genzō Kazami
 Gin Maeda
 Hiroshi Inuzuka as Comedian
 Kiyoshi Atsumi
 Shūichi Ikeda

Awards
25th Mainichi Film Award
Won: Best Film

Criticism 
Scholar Yoshikuni Igarashi called the film "a declaration of war against the regime of the high-growth economy." He views Seiichi's journey as motivated by his desire to maintain economic independence.

References

External links
 

1970 films
Best Film Kinema Junpo Award winners
Films directed by Yoji Yamada
Films with screenplays by Yôji Yamada
1970s Japanese films